The 1999 World Women's Handball Championship, the 14th of its kind, was held between November 29 and December 12, 1999, and was jointly hosted by Denmark and Norway, with the finals being played in Lillehammer, Norway.

Group stage

Group A

Group B

Group C

Group D

Knockout stage

Brackets

Round of 16

Quarter-finals

Final round

Semi-finals

Placement matches

7th/8th

5th/6th

Bronze Match

Final

Rankings and Statistics

All Star Team

Chosen by team officials and IHF experts: IHF.info

Top Goalkeepers

Top goalscorers

External links
 International Handball Federation

World Handball Championship tournaments
H
H
H
H
Women's handball in Denmark
Women's handball in Norway
World Women's Handball Championship
November 1999 sports events in Europe
December 1999 sports events in Europe
Sports competitions in Bergen
Sports competitions in Trondheim
International sports competitions in Oslo
1990s in Oslo